Notable people with surname Khanin (Cyrillic: Ханин) include:

Dov Khanin (born 1958), Israeli political scientist, lawyer, and former member of the Knesset
Grigorii Khanin (born 1937), Russian economist
Konstantin Khanin, contemporary Russian mathematician and physicist
Yuri Khanin, contemporary Russian composer